Janella Maxine Desiderio Salvador (born March 30, 1998) is a Filipino actress and singer. Debuting in the hit morning drama Be Careful with My Heart (2012–2014), she followed with leading roles in Oh My G! (2015), Born for You (2016), So Connected (2018), The Killer Bride (2019–2020) and Darna (2022–2023) as Mars Ravelo supervillain Valentina. Her awards include three PMPC Star Awards, a FAMAS Award, and Princess of Philippine Television.

Early life
Salvador was born in Cebu and raised in San Juan in Metro Manila.

Her parents are West End musical actress Jenine Desiderio and Juan Miguel Salvador, Awit Award winning songwriter and former lead singer of Rage Band.

She has a half-brother and two stepsiblings.

Career

Early career
Like her parents, she has interest in performing arts at a young age.

Between 2008 and 2009, she represented the Philippines in a world trade fair in Seoul, Korea. She appeared on stage in venues such as Meralco Theater, her first lead role being the school musical Paul! Paul! After guesting on Eat Bulaga'''s Sa Pula, Sa Puti, management directors Manny Valera and Star Magic's Johnny Manahan signed her a contract as their talent.

Her official acting debut came in 2012 through the hit daytime drama, Be Careful With My Heart, which aired until 2014. Salvador's character, middle daughter Nikki Grace Lim, was widely known for her Taglish catchphrases. Winning newcomer awards, she would become one of the youngest faces of Garnier skin care.

Salvador also signed film contracts with Regal Entertainment and Star Cinema, both in 2014.

Lead roles and music

ABS-CBN in 2015 cast Salvador in her first leading role in Oh My G! as an orphan who blames God for the trials in her life. On July 1, Salvador released her debut album, which eventually became certified platinum by PARI. After featuring in a song for Hong Kong Disneyland, she made her film debut in director Jun Lana's Haunted Mansion. The film was a top grosser at the 41st Metro Manila Film Festival.

In 2016, she had her second major lead TV role through the music based drama Born for You. Salvador portrays an aspiring musician who studies and works in Tokyo. In the soundtrack, she released her first Japanese language songs. Salvador was announced to work with Disney a third time following her Disney in Concert, Kia Theatre performance with a Philippine exclusive version of Moana's "How Far I'll Go".
2017 came her first solo concert Super Janella. The same year, Salvador would appear in Topel Lee's ensemble film Bloody Crayons. It was announced Salvador would be cast in crime drama The Good Son (formerly Kung Kailangan Mo Ako) but following major script changes, announced she would step down from the role. She then accepted to join Himig Handog a third time through the Karlo Zabala penned song "Wow Na Feelings" which won 4th Best Song and TFC's Global Choice Award. By 2018, she headlined two films. Following a portrayal as a singing mermaid in fantasy film My Fairy Tail Love Story, she would garner praise as a love struck waitress in director Jason Paul Laxamana's rom-com So Connected.  

In 2019, Salvador returned to the small screen after three years through gothic thriller The Killer Bride. Her role as Emma, a mortuary cosmetologist who becomes possessed by the town's spirit won her Princess of Philippine Television at the national Box Office Entertainment Awards. By year end, Salvador starred opposite veteran actress Maricel Soriano in film The Heiress, which was based on the Philippine barang folklore. In 2020 she appeared in Tren, the second highest rating episode of Maalaala Mo Kaya'' for the year. She played Aira, a university student who reconciles with her past lover.

On November 19, 2021, she was confirmed as supervillain Valentina / Regina Vanguardia in Mars Ravelo's Darna, to be directed by Chito S. Roño. The series premiered in August 2022.

Personal life
She was previously in a relationship with Filipino-British actor Markus Paterson.

On October 20, 2020, she gave birth to their son Jude in Bath, Somerset, England.

Discography

Album

Singles

Original soundtrack

Filmography

Film

Television series

Web series

Music video

Stage musical

Awards and nominations

References

External links

Janella Salvador on Star Magic
Janella Salvador on AllMusic
Janella Salvador discography on Discogs

1998 births
Living people
ABS-CBN personalities
Filipino child actresses
Filipino film actresses
Filipino women pop singers
Filipino television actresses
People from Cebu
People from San Juan, Metro Manila
Janella
Star Music artists
21st-century Filipino actresses
21st-century Filipino women singers
Filipino people of Spanish descent
Star Magic